Savvushka is a rural locality (a selo) Savvushinsky Selsoviet, Zmeinogorsky District, Altai Krai, Russia. The population was 1,172 as of 2013. There are 6 streets.

Geography 
Savvushka is located 24 km north of Zmeinogorsk (the district's administrative centre) by road. Novokharkovka is the nearest rural locality.

References 

Rural localities in Zmeinogorsky District